Sena is a 2003 Tamil-language crime film directed by Sujeeth. The film stars Sathyaraj, Aravind Akash and Charulatha while Anandaraj and Chandrasekhar play supporting roles. The film, produced by P. Suneetha Anandakumar, had musical score by D. Imman and was released on 12 April 2003.

Plot

Sena (Sathyaraj) took to rowdyism as a young boy in order to feed his brother Vikram (Aravind Akash). Vikram hates rowdyism and wants Sena to stop his activities. There is a gang war between Mastan Bhai (Anandaraj) and Naaga's (Chandrasekhar) gangs. Sena works for Mastan, and Mastan considers Sena as his best henchman. Naaga, who was Mastan's former right-hand, wants to kill him. Vikram is in love with Janu (Charulatha), who is the sister of police officer Sathya. Sena is close to Sathya. Later, Sathya is killed by Mastan's henchmen, and Vikram wants to punish the culprits. What transpires next forms the rest of the story.

Cast

Sathyaraj as Senathipathi a.k.a. Sena
Aravind Akash as Vikram
Charulatha (credited as Raksha) as Janu
Anandaraj as Mastan Bhai
Chandrasekhar as Naaga
Charle as Pandian
Vijayan as Lawyer Jayan
Anu Mohan as Govindaraj
Vasu Vikram as Police Officer
Rasheed Ummer as Inspector Pasupathy
Pondy Ravi as Inspector Pondy
Crane Manohar
Alphonsa
Ruban George as Kaasi
Junior Silk
Vinod Kishan as Sena (child)

Soundtrack

The film score and the soundtrack were composed by D. Imman. The soundtrack, released in 2003, features 7 tracks. . "Theerathathu Kathal" was a famous romantic hit song from this film.

References

2003 films
2000s Tamil-language films
2003 crime drama films
Indian crime drama films